An Afghan is a traditional New Zealand biscuit made from flour, butter, cornflakes, sugar and cocoa powder, topped with chocolate icing and a half walnut. The recipe has a high proportion of butter, and relatively low sugar, and no leavening (rising agent), giving it a soft, dense and rich texture, with crunchiness from the cornflakes, rather than from a high sugar content. The high butter content gives a soft melt-in-the-mouth texture, and the sweetness of the icing offsets the low sugar and the cocoa bitterness.

Name 
Despite its name, the biscuit's place of origin is thought to be New Zealand. A recipe in The Timaru Herald for "Afghans" (minus the icing and walnut) dates from 1934, and an otherwise identical "Chocolate Cornflakes" biscuit recipe, complete with icing and walnut, was in the same publication of the previous year. 

There are many theories in circulation about the origin of the name "Afghan", ranging from the First Anglo-Afghan War to the biscuit's texture and colour being likened to the landscape of Afghanistan,  while one theory suggests it was named after the traditional Afghan hat, the pakol. In the wake of the George Floyd protests, the manufacturer of the biscuit, Griffin's Foods announced in June 2020 that they would rename the product. In a statement issued by the company, it noted that the name of the biscuit was possibly a reference to the colour of "Afghan brown", which could possibly reference the dark skin of Afghan people. Although they acknowledged "there are other theories in circulation", this caused a debate over the name. The decision came amidst a wave of name changes in New Zealand over foodstuffs with names deemed racist or otherwise culturally offensive by some. The biscuit was eventually renamed "Milk Chocolate Roughs" by Griffin's, which advertised the renaming with a new slogan: "Same bikkie. New name." However, the name "Afghan" is still the one used by other companies.

Ingredients and recipe
According to the Edmonds Cookery Book, a batch of 24 afghans is made by combining  butter,  white sugar,  all-purpose flour,  cocoa powder, and  cornflakes. Once the biscuts are cooled, they are iced with chocolate icing and the half-walnut placed on top.

Some variations on the recipe exist; crushed Weet-Bix may be substituted for cornflakes, for instance.

See also
 List of cookies

References

External links 

 "The way to a man's heart is through his stomach, so I'm baking President Bush some ANZAC biscuits." Cartoon. Source: Tiaki, Alexander Turnbull Library
 "I've been told Anzacs go very well with Afghans". Cartoon. Source: Tiaki, Alexander Turnbull Library

Biscuits
Australian cuisine
Types of food
New Zealand cuisine
New Zealand desserts
New Zealand snack foods
Chocolate desserts
Biscuit brands